The Peruvian Communist Party (abbr. PCP) is a communist party in Peru that was founded in 1928 by José Carlos Mariátegui, under the name Peruvian Socialist Party (PSP). The party changed its name in 1930. In contemporary Peruvian politics, the party is often referred to as the PCP (Unity) to distinguish it from similarly named communist parties, such as the Communist Party of Peru (Red Fatherland) and the Communist Party of Peru (Shining Path).

The party participates in the annual International Meeting of Communist and Workers Parties (IMCWP).

History 
The PCP and other left-wing groups formed the political alliance United Left in 1980.

In the 2011 general election the party took part in the successful Peru Wins alliance of Ollanta Humala.

Leadership 
Jorge del Prado was the party's general secretary from 1966 to 1991. The PCP is currently led by Roberto de La Cruz Huamán.

See also 
 Communism in Peru

References

External links
 of the Peruvian Communist Party
Old website of the Peruvian Communist Party

1928 establishments in Peru
Comintern sections
Communist parties in Peru
Formerly banned communist parties
Foro de São Paulo
International Meeting of Communist and Workers Parties
Political parties established in 1928
Political parties in Peru